Choo Mi-ae (born 23 October 1958) is a South Korean politician who served as the Minister of Justice as well as five-term parliamentarian and 3rd leader of Democratic Party.

She is the first woman to hold the post after Kang Kum-sil who was appointed by then-president Roh Moo-hyun, a political mentor of the incumbent Moon Jae-in. She is also one of handful female parliamentarians who have served five or more terms at the National Assembly and the first to do so without ever being elected through proportional representation.

In 1996, she became the first woman to represent a constituency in Seoul since the Constitution was last revised as well as the first female ex-judge to be elected as a parliamentarian. She has represented the same constituency since then except for four years between 2004 and 2008.

Choo unsuccessfully ran for the leadership of her party twice in 2003 and 2008. In 2016, she became the leader of Democratic Party. When Moon Jae-in got elected as the President of South Korea during her term in 2017, she became the first woman to be the leader of a ruling party. In 2018, he became the first leader of her party to complete its fixed term of two years. Additionally, she was the first female leader of her party and its first leader raised in TK region.

Political career

Entry into politics
Before her involvement in politics, Choo served as a district court judge for 12 years. She left her position in protest of government pressure to bring judgements against pro-democracy activists, and joined the opposition National Congress for New Politics. She entered the National Assembly in the 1996 elections as a member of the  National Congress. She crossed regional barriers by being elected as a liberal despite originally hailing from the conservative stronghold of Daegu, and also became the first female member of the National Assembly to have served as a judge—followed by Na Kyung-won in 2004.

1999 Jeju Uprising inquiry
Choo became notable early in her career as an assemblywoman for being one of the first national politicians to draw public attention to the events of the 1948 Jeju Uprising. She participated in a memorial service for the uprising in 1998, and chaired the first public inquiry into the events the next year. During the debate, Choo released a 200-page dossier listing 1,650 people who had been court-martialed for assisting the "communist rebellion" in Jeju. Her release of the papers marked the first time any official government document on the uprising had been released to the general public.

Party leadership contests and 2004 election campaign
Having served in the assembly for seven years, Choo ran for chairman of the Millennium Democratic Party in 2003, coming in second place behind Cho Soon-hyung. She came into conflict with Chough in the succeeding months in the crisis over the impeachment of President Roh Moo-hyun, with Choo urging Chough to step down over the events. After originally rejecting the role, she was appointed head of the party's election campaign committee less than three weeks before the 2004 parliamentary election. Her fight against regionalism in the party and her management of the party's campaign for the 2004 election during the impeachment crisis earned her the nickname "Choo d'Arc", comparing her to Joan of Arc. She lost her seat in the election.

After her re-election to the Assembly in 2008, Choo stood again for the leadership of the United Democratic Party at the party convention on 6 July 2008. She pushed to broaden and deregionalize the party, and enjoyed broad public support, but ultimately placed second behind Chung Sye-kyun.

Foreign affairs
Choo has served as a member of the Assembly's Foreign Affairs and Unification Committee, and in 2003, she was appointed special envoy to the United States on the North Korean nuclear crisis. Choo visited the United Kingdom in November 2010, giving lectures at Chatham House and the University of Cambridge on future policy in the Korean Peninsula.

Election history

Controversies 
Choo's son is accused of receiving favors during his military service. In 2016, she was convicted guilty for violation of Public Official Election Act due to spreading false information.

Choo has been criticized for her controversial step of not fully disclosing indictments against President Moon Jae-In's allies, of which she is one. Prosecutors have also criticized her broader proposed restructuring of  prosecutors' offices.

Choo's classified as a liberal wing's within the party, but there is a controversy that she expressed a negative view of feminism.

Personal life
Choo is a Buddhist.

See also
 Jeju 4.3 Committee

References

External links 
 Choo Mi-ae on Twitter

1958 births
Living people
Hanyang University alumni
People from Daegu
South Korean Buddhists
South Korean women judges
Yonsei University alumni
Women opposition leaders
Jeonju Chu clan
Women government ministers of South Korea
Members of the National Assembly (South Korea)
Minjoo Party of Korea politicians
Justice ministers of South Korea
Female justice ministers
Female members of the National Assembly (South Korea)